Oregon Route 251 is an Oregon state highway running from Port Orford Heads State Park to Port Orford. OR 251 is known as the Port Orford Highway No. 251 (see Oregon highways and routes).

OR 251 was established in 2002 as part of Oregon's project to assign route numbers to highways that previously were not assigned, and, as of August 2008, was unsigned.

Route description 
OR 251 begins at the eastern boundary of Port Orford Heads State Park and heads east to Port Orford, ending at an intersection with US 101.

History 
OR 251 was assigned to the Port Orford Highway in 2002.

Major intersections

References 
 Oregon Department of Transportation, Descriptions of US and Oregon Routes, https://web.archive.org/web/20051102084300/http://www.oregon.gov/ODOT/HWY/TRAFFIC/TEOS_Publications/PDF/Descriptions_of_US_and_Oregon_Routes.pdf, page 28.
 Oregon Department of Transportation, Port Orford Highway No. 251, ftp://ftp.odot.state.or.us/tdb/trandata/maps/slchart_pdfs_1980_to_2002/Hwy251_2001.pdf

251
Transportation in Curry County, Oregon
Port Orford, Oregon